Mónica Sintra (born 10 June 1978) is a Portuguese singer.

Biography 

Mónica was born in Lisbon, on June 10 of 1978. 

At the age of 11, she joined the "Jovens Cantores de Lisboa". When she reached 15, she recorded her first album, Tu És O Meu Herói. Her next album, Afinal Havia Outra was released in 1998 and won her a platinum, the single soundtrack Na Minha Cama Com Ela. In 2006, Mónica released her album À Espera de Ti. In 2008, she launched the album Acredita.

On 8 December 2010 Mónica's son Duarte was born. This gave her an inspiration and good feelings for new themes. Mónica recorded the song "Meu Pequeno Grande Amor" in honour of the birth of her son Duarte.

In 2011, the singer released the album Um Grande Amor.

In 2018 Sintra revealed that she suffered from bulimia and anorexia.

Discography 

 1995 Tu És O Meu Herói
 1998 Afinal Havia Outra
 1999 Na Minha Cama Com Ela
 2001 Canta O Amor
 2002 The Best Of
 2002 Tudo Por Amor
 2002 Sempre Tua
 2003 O Meu Olhar
 2004 O Melhor de Mónica Sintra
 2006 À Espera de Ti
 2008 Acredita
 2011 Um Grande Amor

References

External links
 Official Site

1978 births
21st-century Portuguese women singers
Portuguese pop singers
Living people
20th-century Portuguese women singers